Daniel James Patterson (often referred to simply as D.J. Patterson) was an American architect around the turn of the 20th century.  Much of his work was done for the Southern Pacific Railroad.

Patterson was born in Jefferson County, New York in 1857, the second of six children born to Tomkins and Susan Patterson.  His father was a carpenter by trade.  He grew up in Minnesota and received his college training at the University of Minnesota.  After college, he moved to Seattle, Washington, to work as a draftsman for Willis Ritchie.  His most notable designs during this time in the Pacific Northwest included the Old Capitol Building in Olympia, and the courthouses in Spokane, Whatcom, and Port Townsend.  He also designed a number of public school buildings.

In 1889, Patterson moved to San Francisco to establish a practice there.  His work caught the attention of the Southern Pacific Railroad (SP), which had its headquarters in San Francisco.   They had him design a number of their stations and other facilities, many of which survive.  Among these were the San Antonio Station, Berkeley Station (1906), the Salt Lake City Union Station, the Tucson Station, and the Willits depot.  He was also the architect for the Union Station (1911) in Seattle, Washington.  He designed three of the SP's hospitals, in San Francisco, El Paso, and Houston, as well as many of the railroad's industrial structures, such as electrical sub-stations and the Alameda Shops.

Although most of his work in San Francisco was done for the SP railroad, Patterson maintained his practice on behalf of other clients.  One of these was himself.  He designed his own home which still stands on Divisadero Street.  He also designed a large 4-story house for Jeremiah and Elizabeth Burke in Berkeley, California.  The house has been preserved as the landmarked Burke House which has served for many years as the home of the Judah L. Magnes Museum, a museum of Jewish history in the American west.

Gallery

References

 "Daniel J. Patterson", The Bulletin, Railroad Station Historical Society, Vol.37, No.1, Jan.-Feb. 2004
"Additional Depots Designed by Daniel J. Patterson", The Bulletin, Railroad Station Historical Society, Vol.37, No.4, July-Aug. 2004 
Davis' Commercial Encyclopedia of the Pacific Southwest, compiler and publisher, Ellis A. Davis, Berkeley, California, 1911
"Berkeley's Lost Station", Carlos A. Fernandez-Gray, Newsletter of the Berkeley Architectural Heritage Association, Berkeley, California, Number 109, Spring-Summer 2002
Berkeley Landmarks: an illustrated guide to Berkeley, California's architectural heritage, Susan Dinkelspiel Cerny, Berkeley Architectural Heritage Association, 1994

External links

1857 births
Year of death missing
American railway architects
Southern Pacific Railroad